Breach of Trust is a 2017 Cameroonian film featuring actors from UK, Cameroon and Nigeria which explores perceptions of incest as a taboo and views of perpetrators. The film is produced by Roseline Fonkwa.

Plot
Breach of Trust tells us the story of the lives of two families who try to live a normal life but unfortunately one of the family members in each households sexually abuses these young girls. These abusers and parents are in a position of trust but they choose to sexually abuse their young family members. It an epic story that explores how we perceive incest as a taboo and instead of addressing it and dealing with it, standing up to the abusers, protecting the victims, support the victims to stand up to their abusers and put an end to the abuse or the cycle, it is instead concealed due to societal pressures, fear, guilt, not knowing whom to talk to, where to get support from, feeling threatened, wanting to protect the abusers image, reputation, family name and even the fear of not being believed. The feelings are numerous and as a society, most people have chosen to keep this form of abuse as a secret leaving the victims and others to suffer as well as letting the abusers carry out repeated acts of failing to get treatment.

Cast
Chris Allen as The Mayor of London
Princess Brun Njua	as  Oler Array
Gelam Dickson as Mr. Tabi
Mirabelle Ade  as Enanga's Mum
Epule Jeffrey as Paul Achang
Susan Kempling Oben as Mrs. Tabi
Martha Muambo as Enanga Achang
Whitney Raine as Young Array

Release
Breach of Trust was released on 9 June 2017.

Reception
The movie was premiered at the Odeon Cinemas Greenwich London.  Celebrity website fabafriq described the movie as "the revolutionary movie set to change the face of Cameroon Movie Industry."
The movie was premiere in Douala on October 21, 2017.

See also
 List of Cameroonian films
 Cinema of Nigeria

References

External links
 

Cameroonian drama films
English-language Cameroonian films
2017 films
2010s English-language films